The men's 400 metres event  at the 1987 European Athletics Indoor Championships was held on 21 and 22 February.

Medalists

Results

Heats

Semifinals
First 3 from each semifinal qualified directly (Q) for the final.

Final

References

400 metres at the European Athletics Indoor Championships
400